Eleanor Academia (born 1964 in San Diego, California), or simply known as Eleanor, is a dance music singer and producer.

Career
Academia is of Filipino Hawaiian descent, and was born and raised in National City, San Diego. She went on to release her debut album entitled Jungle Wave in 1987 on Columbia Records. Singer Maurice White also guested on the album. From the LP the 1988 single "Adventure" rose to number one on the Billboard Hot Dance Music/Club Play chart. Academia also released another album, Global Conversations on Epic Records.

She would later launch her own record label known as Black Swan Records. Academia went on to release on this label her third album, Oracle of the Black Swan. She has also gone on to create, produce and host an indie radio show titled The LA Music Pipeline where she showcases independent artists.

Discography

Albums
1987: Jungle Wave
1992: Global Conversations
1998: Oracle of the Black Swan

Singles
1987: "Better Safe Than Sorry"
1987: "Perfection (Edited Version)" (Japan release)
1988: "Adventure"

See also
List of number-one dance hits (United States)
List of artists who reached number one on the U.S. dance chart

References

External links
Official website

1958 births
American dance musicians
American electronic musicians
American musicians of Filipino descent
Living people
Singers from California
Columbia Records artists
Epic Records artists